The Beach volleyball competition at the 2010 Central American and Caribbean Games was held in Cabo Rojo, Puerto Rico.

The tournament was scheduled to be held from 23 to 27 July at the Cabo Rojo Beach Volleyball Field in Porta del Sol.

Medal summary

Men's tournament

Preliminary round

Group A

Group B

Group C

Group D

Playoffs

First round

Second round

Repechage

Semifinals

Finals

Bronze-medal match

Gold-medal match

Women's tournament

Preliminary round

Group A

Group B

Group C

Group D

Playoffs

Quarterfinals

Semifinals

Finals

Bronze-medal match

Gold-medal match

References

External links

Events at the 2010 Central American and Caribbean Games
Beach volleyball at the Central American and Caribbean Games
Central American and Caribbean Games